National Academy of Health & Business is now Anderson College of Health, Business and Technology, a diploma-granting Career college with campuses in Mississauga, Hamilton, North York, Downtown, and Midtown Toronto, Ontario. The college was founded in 1979 and is recognized for its Healthcare, Business, Technology  and Law Enforcement courses.

Anderson College is registered as a Private Career College under the Private Career College Act, 2005.

Programs of study
Though the courses available differ between campuses, Anderson College offers diplomas in the following:
 Accounting & Payroll
Business Administration 
Business Management 
Cardiology Technologist 
Early Childcare Assistant 
English as a Second Language (ESL) 
Intra Oral Level I and II Dental Assistant
 Medical Office Administrator 
 Pharmacy Assistant
 Personal Support Worker
 Medical Laboratory Technician
 Physiotherapy & Occupational Therapy Assistant
 Law Enforcement / Police Foundations
 Supply Chain and Logistics

Anderson college may offer more courses in the near future. Visit www.andersoncollege.com for updated information

Accreditation
Anderson College is a member of Ontario Association of Career Colleges (OACC) and the National Association of Career Colleges (NACC).

The school's certifications and recognitions include (but are not limited to):
 Ontario Dental Nurses and Assistants Association (ODAA)
 National Dental Assistants Examination Board (NDAEB)
 Ontario Society of Medical Technologists (OSMT)
 Laboratory Assistants Committee (CLA)
 Ontario Medical Secretaries Association-Health Care Associates (OMSA-HCA)
 Ontario College of Pharmacists (OCP)
 Canadian Council of Professional Certification (CCPC)

Campus locations
Anderson College has five campus locations in Ontario:
 Mississauga campus, at 165 Dundas Street West
 Hamilton campus, at 31 King Street East
 Toronto campus, at 20 Eglinton Avenue East
Downtown Toronto Campus, 180 Bloor Street West
North York Campus, 5734 Yonge Street

See also
 List of colleges in Ontario
 Higher education in Ontario

References

External links
 

Education in Mississauga
Private colleges in Ontario
Educational institutions established in 1979
Education in Hamilton, Ontario
1979 establishments in Ontario